Lemania was a Swiss watch manufacturer and manufacturer of watch movements. 

It was founded in 1884 by Alfred Lugrin (1858-1920), who had trained at Jaeger-LeCoultre. Lugrin received awards and gold medals at exhibitions in Milan in 1906 and in Berne in 1914. Until 1930, the factory was called Lugrin SA, until Lugrin's son-in-law Marius Meylan established the brand name Lemania Watch Co., based in l'Orient. 

In 1932, Lemania, Omega and Tissot merged to form the SSIH group.

Lemania produced movements for Omega, including for the Speedmaster that Buzz Aldrin wore on the moon.

With the advent of electronic watches in the 1970s, sales of mechanical watches from the SSIH Group collapsed. In 1980, creditor banks gave Nicolas Hayek the task of restructuring the group. In the course of a management buyout, Lemania separated from the SSIH Group in 1981 and changed its name to Nouvelle Lemania. In 1992 the Nouvelle Lemania was bought by Breguet. The Lemania calibers are still used today in watches of numerous well-known brands.

References

External links

 Watch Legends: The Calibre Lemania 5100
 Lemania chronograph, Cal. 2310, circa 1950

Watch manufacturing companies of Switzerland